Karl-August Graf von Reisach (7 July 1800, in Roth, Bavaria22 December 1869,  in the Redemptorist monastery of Contamine, France) was a German Catholic theologian and Cardinal.

Education

On the completion of his secular studies in Neuburg an der Donau, he studied philosophy at Munich (1816), and jurisprudence at Heidelberg, Göttingen, and Landshut, securing (1821) the Degree of Doctor Juris Utriusque. Devoting himself a little later to the study of theology, he received minor orders at Innsbruck in 1824, was ordained in 1828 after philosophical and theological studies in the German College at Rome, and in the following year graduated Doctor of Theology.

Service in Rome

Pope Pius VII appointed him rector of studies at the Sacred Congregation for the Propagation of the Faith, an office which brought him into close relations with its prefect, Cardinal-Priest Bartolomeo Cappellari, who later became Pope Gregory XVI.

Urged to devote special attention to the affairs of the Catholic Church in Germany, he attacked the current anti-ecclesiastical views and tendencies, especially with regard to mixed marriages, in his work Was haben wir von den Reformatoren und Stimmführen des katholischen Deutschland unserer Tage zu halten?, which appeared at Mainz in 1835 under the pseudonym Athanasius Sincerus Philalethes.

Return to Germany

In 1836 he became Bishop of Eichstätt (Bavaria) and, by the foundation of the boys' seminary (1838) and the erection of the lyceum (1843), rendered the greatest services to the ecclesiastical life of the diocese. As delegate of the pope and the Kings of Prussia and Bavaria, he mediated in the Prussian ecclesiastical dispute, and the rapid settlement of the Cologne muddle (Kölner Wirren - see Clemens August von Droste-Vischering) was due primarily to him.

Vatican service

In recognition of his services, he was named Coadjutor in 1841, and Archbishop of Munich-Freising in 1847 . His zeal on behalf of the Church having rendered him unpleasing to the Government, he was, at the request of King Maximilian II of Bavaria, summoned to Rome by Pope Pius IX as Cardinal-Priest, with the title of St. Anastasia.

He conducted the concordat negotiations with Württemberg and Baden and took a prominent part in the preparations for the council.

Reisach was also appointed to the following positions:

1867

President of the Congregation of Ecclesiastico-political Affairs
Camerlengo of the Sacred College of Cardinals

1868

Cardinal-Bishop of Sabina

1869

First legate of the council
Consultor of the Congregation for the Index
Responsible for the publication of the ecclesiastical canons of the Eastern Churches,
Consultor to Congregation for Extraordinary Ecclesiastical Affairs
Consultor to the Examination of Bishops
Member of the Congregation of the Propaganda and the Congregation of Sacred Rites
Minister of Education for the Papal States

References

External links
 

1800 births
1869 deaths
19th-century German cardinals
Cardinals created by Pope Pius IX
Cardinal-bishops of Sabina
Roman Catholic archbishops of Munich and Freising
Members of the Bavarian Reichsrat
Burials at Munich Frauenkirche
19th-century Roman Catholic archbishops in Bavaria
German Roman Catholic archbishops